Zhang Ruoyun (born 24 August 1988) is a Chinese actor. He graduated from the Beijing Film Academy in 2007.

Career

2004–2014: Beginnings
Zhang made his acting debut in 2004, acting as the younger version of the male protagonist in The Sea's Promise. He first gained attention for his roles in Snow Leopard (2010) and its companion series, Black Fox (2011). He won the Most Popular New Actor award in 2010 for his performance in Snow Leopard. Zhang took on his first lead role in war drama Sharp Sword.

In 2014, he starred in New Snow Leopard, and won the Outstanding Actor award at the China TV Drama Awards.

2015–present: Rising popularity
In 2015, Zhang starred in the web drama Wu Xin: The Monster Killer. The series was popular in both China and Taiwan, and led to increased recognition for Zhang in the region. Zhang then starred in youth romance drama Promise of Migratory Birds and fantasy dramas Novoland: The Castle in the Sky and Legend of Nine Tails Fox.

In 2016, Zhang starred in the hit espionage drama Sparrow. The popularity of the series propelled Zhang to mainstream popularity, and he won the Most Popular Actor award at the China TV Drama Awards. He then headlined the web drama Medical Examiner Dr. Qin. The series gained over 1.5 billion views on Sohu TV, and earned praise for its storyline and his performance. The same year, Zhang starred in his first film, Sky on Fire.

In 2017, he was cast in the titular role of Huo Qubing in upcoming historical drama, The Fated General. The same year, Zhang starred in the Chinese remake of Korean drama Dear My Friends. Zhang ranked 94th on Forbes China Celebrity 100 list.

In 2018, Zhang starred in the romantic comedy drama The Evolution of Our Love. 

In 2019, Zhang starred in the spy drama Awakening of Insects, the sequel to the 2016 hit drama Sparrow. He then starred as the male lead in historical epic Joy of Life based on the novel Qing Yu Nian by Mao Ni. Joy of Life received positive reviews and was a hit. 

In 2020, Zhang was cast in the legal drama Perfect Evidence. The same year, he reunited with Joy of Life writer Wang Juan in the wuxia drama Sword Snow Stride. He ranked 37th on Forbes'' China Celebrity 100 list.

Personal life 
Zhang and actress Tang Yixin revealed their relationship through Weibo on August 2, 2017. They got married in Ireland on June 27, 2019 after dating for close to 9 years.

Filmography

Film

Television series

Variety show

Discography

Awards and nominations

Forbes China Celebrity 100

References

External links
 

1988 births
Living people
21st-century Chinese male actors
Chinese male television actors
Chinese male film actors
Male actors from Beijing
Beijing Film Academy alumni